Astor Theatre can refer to:

 Astor Theatre, New York City, Broadway, New York City
 Astor Place Theatre, off-Broadway, New York City
 Astor Theatre, Perth, in Western Australia
 The Astor Theatre, in Victoria, Australia
 Astor Theatre, Surat in Queensland, Australia
 The Astor Theatre, in Liverpool, Nova Scotia, Canada